MacDuff & Co Ltd (in Liquidation) v Johannesburg Consolidated Investment Co Ltd is the leading case in South African contract law on the issue of fictional fulfilment of suspensive conditions.

Facts 
The case involved two companies: Johannesburg Consolidated Investment (JCI) was a minority shareholder in Macduff & Co. JCI had entered into a contract with Macduff whereby the latter would undergo voluntary liquidation. Macduff agreed that, once liquidated, it would transfer all its assets into a newly founded company under the auspices and supervision of JCI. In the agreement was a suspensive condition which permitted liquidation only if the shareholders of Macduff agreed to it.

At the time of contracting, this was a promising deal for JCI. When market conditions changed, however, it was no longer of much economic benefit. JCI accordingly bought up shares in Macduff, until it was the majority shareholder, and then voted against liquidation, deliberately obstructing the possibility of the occurrence of the suspensive condition in the contract.

Judgment 
The Appellate Division ruled that such obstruction was unlawful, and therefore that there was fictional fulfillment of the suspensive condition. JCI was thus held liable for breach of contract.

See also 
 Contract
 Law of South Africa
 South African contract law

References

Books 
 Du Plessis, Jacques, et al. The Law of Contract in South Africa. Edited by Dale Hutchison, Chris-James Pretorius, Mark Townsend and Helena Janisch. Cape Town, Western Cape: Oxford University Press, 2010.

Cases 
 MacDuff & Co Ltd (in Liquidation) v Johannesburg Consolidated Investment Co Ltd 1924 AD 573.

Notes 

1924 in South African law
1924 in case law
Appellate Division (South Africa) cases
South African contract case law